Defending champions Martina Navratilova and Pam Shriver successfully defended their title, defeating Anne Hobbs and Wendy Turnbull in the final, 6–2, 6–4 to win the women's doubles tennis title at the 1984 US Open. It was the third step in an eventual Grand Slam for the pair.

Seeds

Draw

Finals

Top half

Section 1

Section 2

Bottom half

Section 3

Section 4

External links 
1984 US Open – Women's draws and results at the International Tennis Federation

Women's Doubles
US Open (tennis) by year – Women's doubles
1984 in women's tennis
1984 in American women's sports